Maido is an Estonian-language male given name.

People named Maido include:
 Maido Pajo (born 1950), Estonian politician
 Maido Pakk (born 1989), Estonian footballer

References

Estonian masculine given names